The Ministry of Defence of Montenegro (МОЦГ, MOCG) is the ministry in the Government of Montenegro that is in charge of the nation's military.

List of ministers

References

External links
Montenegrin Ministry of Defence

Defence
Montenegro
Montenegro
Montenegro